is Hatsune Okumura's debut single. It was released on September 5, 2007, by Avex Trax.

Overview
The CD+DVD edition includes the Koi, Hanabi short film starring AAA's Takahiro Nishijima, Mitsuki Tanimura and Kenichi Endō.

Specifics
Artist: Okumura Hatsune
Title: 
Code: AVCD-31288/B CD+DVD; AVCD-31289 CD Only
Release Date: 2007.09.05 
Price: ￥1,890 CD+DVD; ￥1,050 CD Only

Track list

CD section
 
 
  (Instrumental)
  (Instrumental)

DVD Section

Charts

Oricon chart positions

2007 debut singles
2007 songs